Iganõmme Landscape Conservation Area is a nature park situated in Rapla County, Estonia.

Its area is 5 ha.

The protected area was designated in 1960 to protect Iganõmme Pakamäe Outcrop (:et) and its surrounding areas. In 2006, the protected area was redesignated a landscape conservation area.

References

Nature reserves in Estonia
Geography of Rapla County